Scirpophaga humilis is a moth in the family Crambidae. It was described by Wang, Li and Chen in 1986. It is found in China (Jiangsu, Anhui).

The forewings are uniform pale yellow, females with a yellow anal tuft.

References

Moths described in 1986
Schoenobiinae
Moths of Asia